Jurbijarkol (also Romanized as Jūbījārkol and Jowbījārkol; also known as Dzhodzherkul, Jojarkul, Jowbejārkol, Jowjarkūl, and Jūbjārkol) is a village in Kenar Sar Rural District, Kuchesfahan District, Rasht County, Gilan Province, Iran. At the 2006 census, its population was 357, in 108 families.

References 

Populated places in Rasht County